Thamiocolus is a genus of beetles belonging to the family Curculionidae.

The species of this genus are found in Europe.

Species:
 Thamiocolus albocruciatus Colonnelli, 1994 
  Thamiocolus anthracinus Colonnelli, 2005

References

Curculionidae
Curculionidae genera